The 1957–58 Bulgarian Hockey League season was the sixth season of the Bulgarian Hockey League, the top level of ice hockey in Bulgaria. Nine teams participated in the league, and Cerveno Zname Sofia won the championship.

Standings

External links
 Season on hockeyarchives.info

Bul
Bulgarian Hockey League seasons
Bulg